Ron Read (January 13, 1936 – March 5, 2021), known professionally as Buddy Colt, Ty Colt and "Cowboy" Ron Reed, was an American professional wrestler who worked in NWA promotions including the St. Louis Wrestling Club, Championship Wrestling from Florida and Georgia Championship Wrestling. Among others, he won the NWA Georgia Heavyweight Championship seven times, the NWA Florida Southern Heavyweight Championship four and the NWA North American Heavyweight Championship once.

Professional wrestling career 
Trained by Killer Karl Krupp, Buddy Colt made his pro wrestling debut in 1962 in Nick Gulas and Bob Welch's NWA Mid-America in the Tennessee region, worked under the name “Cowboy” Ron Reed. Aside from NWA Mid-America, he also worked St. Louis Wrestling Club, went to the West Coast to work for the World Wrestling Alliance (WWA) where he was renamed Ty Colt. In 1969, he renamed to Buddy Colt working NWA Western States, the Amarillo, Texas promotion run by the Funk family, where he quickly won the NWA North American Heavyweight Championship.

On February 20, 1975, Colt was the pilot of a plane which crashed in water near Tampa Bay, resulting in the death of Bobby Shane. Colt and passengers Gary Hart and Austin Idol were seriously injured. He retired from wrestling due to broken ankles, which later developed gangrene and were fused together, but continued to fly. He remained in Championship Wrestling from Florida as a color commentator along with Gordon Solie and had part ownership of the company.

Colt grew up in Bladensburg, Maryland, before becoming an aviation mechanic and sergeant in the United States Marines, discharging in January 1957. He died on March 5, 2021, aged 85. He had Parkinson's disease and dementia, and was survived by his wife, son, and five daughters.

Championships and accomplishments

50th State Big Time Wrestling
NWA Hawaii Heavyweight Championship (1 time)

Central States Wrestling
NWA Central States Heavyweight Championship (2 times)
NWA North American Tag Team Championship (Central States version) (2 times) – with Doug Gilbert 

Championship Wrestling from Florida
NWA Florida Heavyweight Championship (4 times)
NWA Florida Television Championship (1 time)
NWA Southern Heavyweight Championship (Florida version) (4 times)

Georgia Championship Wrestling
NWA Georgia Heavyweight Championship (7 times)
NWA Macon Tag Team Championship (4 times) - with Homer O'Dell, Karl Von Stroheim, Skandor Akbar and Big Bad John 

Western States Sports
NWA North American Heavyweight Championship (Amarillo version) (1 time)
NWA Western States Tag Team Championship (2 times) – with Gorgeous George Jr.

References

External links 
 

1936 births
2021 deaths
American male professional wrestlers
Professional wrestlers from Maryland
Professional wrestling announcers
Survivors of aviation accidents or incidents
Deaths from Parkinson's disease
Deaths from dementia
20th-century professional wrestlers
NWA Florida Heavyweight Champions
NWA Florida Television Champions
NWA Southern Heavyweight Champions (Florida version)
NWA Macon Tag Team Champions
NWA Macon Heavyweight Champions
NWA Georgia Heavyweight Champions
NWA Georgia Tag Team Champions
United States Marines